Balumamachya Navan Changbhala is Marathi TV series which is airing on Colors Marathi. The show premiered on 13 August 2018. It stars Sumeet Pusavale in titular role.

Premises 
"Balumama" was a Kannada saint born in Belgaum into the Dhangar community. He has followers from Maharashtra, Karnataka, and Telangana. He would take care of his sheep. His sheep are recognized to be very sacred and auspicious. Balumama is believed to be a Lord Mahadev's incarnation and he devoted his existence to help needy people.

Cast 
 Sumeet Pusavale as adult Balumama
 Samarth Patil as Young Balumama
 Rohit Deshmukh as Mayappa, Balumama's father
 Ankita Panvelkar as Sundara, Balumama's mother
 Mayur Khandage as Panch
 Advait Kulkarni as Small Gundappa
 Akshay Dandekar as Young Gundappa
 Sajari Ayachit as Small Satyavva
 Komal More as Young Satyavva
 Akshay Tak as Tatya
 Vaibhav Rajendra as Bheema
 Meenakshi Rathod as Panch Bai

Reception 
It gained fifth position in Week 28 of 2019 with 3.4 TRP in Top 5 Marathi TV Shows.

References

External links 
  Balumamachya Navan Changbhala at Voot
 

Marathi-language television shows
Colors Marathi original programming
2018 Indian television series debuts